Bellinzago Lombardo (Milanese: , locally ) is a comune (municipality) in the Metropolitan City of Milan in the Italian region Lombardy, located about  northeast of Milan.

Bellinzago Lombardo borders the following municipalities: Gessate, Inzago, Gorgonzola, Pozzuolo Martesana.

References

External links
 Official website

Cities and towns in Lombardy